Dumas is a Southern French topographic surname, with fused preposition and definite article , for someone who lived in an isolated dwelling in the country rather than in a village, from Occitan mas 'farmstead' (Late Latin mansum, mansus).

People surnamed Dumas include:

Adolphe Dumas (1805–1861), French poet.
Alexandre Dumas, père (1802–1870), French novelist and author of The Three Musketeers and The Count of Monte Cristo
Alexandre Dumas, fils (1824–1895), son of the above and also a novelist, author of The Lady of the Camellias
Amy Dumas (born 1975), former professional wrestler better known as "Lita"
Caroline Dumas (born 1935), French soprano
Charles Dumas (disambiguation), multiple people
Daniel Dumas (born 1983), Australian rugby player
Dumas (musician) (born 1979), Canadian musician born Steve Dumas
Franck Dumas (born 1968), French football player and manager
Frédéric Dumas (1913–1991), one of the first two diving companions of Jacques-Yves Cousteau
Georges Dumas (1866–1946), French physician and psychologist
Gilles Dumas, French rugby league footballer and coach
Guillaume-Mathieu Dumas, comte Dumas (1753–1837), French general
Gustave Dumas (1872–1955), Swiss mathematician
Henry Dumas (1934–1968), African-American poet and author
Jean-Baptiste Dumas (1800–1884), French chemist
Joseph Dumas (1875–1950), Canadian politician
Marlene Dumas (born 1953), South African artist
Maurice Dumas (1927–2015), Canadian professor and politician
Mireille Dumas (born 1953), French journalist
Pierre Benoît Dumas (1668–1745), French Governor General of Pondicherry and Réunion
 René-François Dumas (1753-1794) a French revolutionary lawyer
Richard Dumas (born 1969), American basketball player
Roger Dumas, multiple people
Roland Dumas (born 1922), French politician and lawyer
Romain Dumas (born 1977), French racing driver
Russell Dumas (1887–1975), Australian engineer and public servant
Stephanie Summerow Dumas, the first African-American woman elected as a county commissioner in the history of Ohio
Tancrède Dumas (1830–1905), Italian photographer
Thomas-Alexandre Dumas (1762–1806), general of the French Revolution and father of the novelist Alexandre Dumas, père
Tony Dumas (born 1972), American basketball player
Vito Dumas (1900–1965), Argentine single-handed sailor

See also
Edward Canfor-Dumas (born 1957), English TV scriptwriter and novelist

References

Surnames of French origin
French-language surnames